Gulliver's Travels is a 1939 American animated musical fantasy film produced by Max Fleischer and directed by Dave Fleischer for Fleischer Studios. Released to cinemas in the United States on December 22, 1939, by Paramount Pictures, the story is a very loose adaptation of Jonathan Swift's 1726 novel of the same name, specifically only the first part of four, which tells the story of Lilliput and Blefuscu, and centers around an explorer who helps a small kingdom who declared war after an argument over a wedding song. The film was Fleischer Studios' first feature-length animated film, as well as the second animated feature film produced by an American studio after Walt Disney Productions' Snow White and the Seven Dwarfs, as Paramount had commissioned the feature in response to the success of that film. The sequences for the film were directed by Seymour Kneitel, Willard Bowsky, Tom Palmer, Grim Natwick, William Henning, Roland Crandall, Thomas Johnson, Robert Leffingwell, Frank Kelling, Winfield Hoskins, and Orestes Calpini.

Plot
On November 5, 1699, Lemuel Gulliver washes onto the beach of Lilliput after his ship is wrecked in a storm. Town crier Gabby stumbles across an unconscious Gulliver during his rounds  ("All's Well") and rushes back to Lilliput to warn everyone about the "giant on the beach". Meanwhile, King Little of Lilliput and King Bombo of Blefuscu are signing a wedding contract between their children, Princess Glory of Lilliput and Prince David of Blefuscu, respectively. An argument starts over which national anthem is to be played at the wedding; the anthem of Lilliput ("Faithful") or the anthem of Blefuscu ("Forever"). In fury, King Bombo cancels the wedding and declares war against Liliput. He seems to consider changing his mind, but then Gabby rushes in, and a guard pursuing Gabby accidentally grabs Bombo, who takes it as an insult and storms off.

Gabby tells King Little of the "giant", and leads a mob to the beach to capture him. There, the Lilliputians tie Gulliver to a wagon and convey him to the town. The next morning, Gulliver awakens and breaks himself free, terrifying the Lilliputians. The Blefuscuian fleet arrives at Lilliput and starts firing upon the castle. Seeing Gulliver laughing at him, Bombo panics and orders a hasty retreat. Realizing that they can use Gulliver as a weapon, the Lilliputians start to treat him with hospitality and even make him a new set of clothes ("It's A Hap-Hap Happy Day").

Back in Blefuscu, King Bombo is embarrassed by the defeat, and orders his three spies in Lilliput - Sneak, Snoop and Snitch - to "get rid of that giant or else." Meanwhile, in celebration of the defeat, the Lilliputians treat Gulliver to dinner and a show ("Bluebirds in the Moonlight"). When the Lilliputians fall asleep after the show, Gulliver walks to the shore, unaware that his pistol has been taken, and reminisces about sailing ("I Hear A Dream (Come Home)"). The next day, after some horseplay with Gabby, Gulliver notices a building on fire and uses a nearby stream to put it out, not realizing he just saved the spies who wish to kill him. Later that night, Prince David sneaks back into Lilliput to visit Princess Glory. Gabby overhears the Prince singing a reprise of "Forever" and, mistaking him for a spy, orders the guards to attack the prince. Noticing this, Gulliver picks up David and Glory in his hands, and they tell him of the war's cause. Gulliver suggests that they combine "Faithful" and "Forever" into one song.

In Blefuscu, Bombo receives a message from his spies assuring him that Gulliver will be a "dead duck" whenever he gives the word, and he announces by carrier pigeon that he will attack at dawn. Gabby intercepts this message and warns the Lilliputians. Because of this, the spies aren't aware of the order until they capture Gabby just as the Lilliputians are marching to the beach ("We're All Together Now"). They hastily prepare Gulliver's pistol. As the Blefuscuian fleet approaches Lilliput, Gulliver demands they lay down their arms and settle matters peaceably. When they continue shooting, he ties the Blefuscuian ships together using their anchors and draws them to shore, saving any men who fall overboard in the process to show he means no ill will. The spies aim and fire at Gulliver from a cliff, but Prince David diverts the shot and, while doing so, falls to his apparent death. Using David's body to illustrate his point, Gulliver scolds both Lilliput and Blefuscu for their senseless fighting. While they solemnize a truce, Gulliver reveals that David is unharmed, whereupon David and Glory sing their combined song for everyone to hear ("Faithful Forever"). Both sides thereafter build a new ship for Gulliver, and he sails off into the sunset ("Come Home Reprise").

Cast
 Sam Parker as Gulliver
 Max Smith as Gulliver (singing voice)
 Pinto Colvig as Gabby, Snitch, Gulliver (water gurgling sounds)
 Jack Mercer as Prince David, King Little, Twinkletoes, Snoop, Horses, Royal Chef
 Lanny Ross as the singing voice of Prince David
 Tedd Pierce as King Bombo, Sneak, Villagers
 Lovey Warren as Princess Glory
 Jessica Dragonette as the singing voice of Princess Glory
 Joe Oriolo as Italian Barber
 Margie Hines as Lilliputian Woman, Princess Glory (some crying and sobs)
 Carl Meyer as Lilliputians

Music

All of the songs were written by Leo Robin and composed by Ralph Rainger with the exception of "It's a Hap-Hap-Happy Day", which was written by Sammy Timberg, Al Neiburg and Winston Sharples.

The Gulliver's Travels score by Victor Young was nominated for a Best Original Score Academy Award while the song "Faithful/Forever" was nominated for Best Original Song, but both of them lost out to The Wizard of Oz with the film winning the latter category for the song "Over the Rainbow". "It's a Hap-Hap-Happy Day" and "All's Well" later became standard themes used for Fleischer and Famous Studios cartoon scores, while "I Hear a Dream" was quite popular as well.

Selections from the music score was released by Marco Polo Records in 1997 as part of "The Classic Film Music of Victor Young" album  (alongside selected cues for the 1952 Oscar-winning film The Greatest Show on Earth, The Uninvited and Bright Leaf).

Covers
"Faithful Forever": Glenn Miller & His Orchestra, Judy Garland
"Faithful Forever": Michael Poss
"It's a Hap-Hap-Happy Day": Bob Zurke & His Delta Rhythm Band, Arthur Askey, Guy Lombardo and His Royal Canadians, Judy Garland
"Bluebirds in the Moonlight": Glenn Miller

Production

Max Fleischer had envisioned a feature as early as 1934, but Paramount vetoed the idea based largely on their interests in maintaining financial solvency following their series of bankruptcy reorganizations. However, after the success of Walt Disney Productions' Snow White and the Seven Dwarfs, Paramount wanted to duplicate the Disney success and ordered a feature for a 1939 Christmas release, which would be Paramount's very first animated feature. When the story was first written in New York, Popeye the Sailor had originally been cast as Gulliver. This was scrapped, however, and the story was restructured once the West Coast team of Cal Howard, Tedd Pierce, and Edmond Seward came aboard (although Popeye would later be cast as a Gulliver-like character in an abridged version of the story called "Popeye's Travels", made for the 1960s Popeye the Sailor television show).

One of the major challenges for Fleischer Studios was the 18-month delivery envelope, coming at a time when Fleischer Studios was relocating to Miami, Florida. While Snow White was in production for 18 months, it had been in development for just as long, allowing for a total of three years to reach the screen. To meet this deadline, the Fleischer staff was greatly expanded to some 800 employees. Animation training classes were set up with Miami art schools as a conduit for additional workers. Experienced lead animators were lured from Hollywood studios, including Nelson Demorest, Joe D'Igalo, and former Fleischer Animators Grim Natwick, Al Eugster, and Shamus Culhane, who returned after working for the Walt Disney Studios.

Several West Coast techniques were introduced in order to provide better animation and greater personality in the characters. Some animators adapted while others did not. Pencil tests were unheard of in New York but were soon embraced as a tool for improving production methods. While the majority of the characters were animated through conventional animation techniques, rotoscoping was used to animate Gulliver, Glory, and David. Sam Parker, the voice of Gulliver, also modeled for the live-action reference.

The rushed schedule seemed to take precedence over quality, and overtime was the order of the day. Even with the rush, deadlines were compromised with Paramount considering canceling the film. Relations with the Technicolor lab were strained due to these constant delays largely associated with the remote location of Miami.

Fleischer Studios delivered Gulliver for Paramount's planned Christmas release schedule, opening in New York on December 20, 1939, going into general release two days later. Considering the potential demonstrated in the two Popeye specials, Gulliver's Travels lacked the built-in brand recognition of those shorts. This much-anticipated feature produced by Max Fleischer was still met with by an eager public and started out well, breaking box-office records in spite of the inevitable comparisons to Snow White.

Based on the overwhelming business success of Gulliver's Travels in its opening run, Barney Balaban immediately ordered another feature for a 1941 Christmas release. In spite of running over the original budget, Paramount made a profit of at least $1,000,000 domestically.

Vocal talent
The voice cast consisted of a variety of performers. The voice of Gabby was provided by Pinto Colvig, who had previously worked at Disney. Colvig had previously been the voice of Goofy, provided vocal effects for Pluto, was the stern Practical Pig in The Three Little Pigs, and voiced Grumpy and Sleepy in Snow White and the Seven Dwarfs. Jack Mercer, who portrayed King Little of Lilliput, was a story man for Fleischer's who lent his voice to the gruff Popeye the Sailor. In addition to voicing King Little, Mercer was also the voice behind Bombo's spies, Sneak, Snoop, and Snitch. Mercer was a regular voice heard in Fleischer and Famous Studios cartoons, and worked for Paramount until Famous Studios was dissolved. Jessica Dragonette and Lanny Ross were both popular singers of the day, and were hired to sing for Princess Glory and Prince David, respectively. Sam Parker was a radio announcer in the 1930s who won the role of Gulliver in a radio contest. When the Fleischers met Parker, they felt that his appearance was suitable for him to also perform in the live action footage that would be rotoscoped to create Gulliver's movement. Tedd Pierce was a story man hired away from Leon Schlesinger Productions to join Fleischer in their trip to Miami. Pierce, who would occasionally do voices for some of the characters in the cartoons, played King Bombo.

Release
Like Snow White before it, Gulliver was a success at the box-office, earning $3.27 million in the United States during its original run, even as it was limited to fifty theaters during the 1939 Christmas season. This box-office success prompted a second feature to be ordered for a Christmas 1941 release, Mr. Bug Goes to Town. Following its domestic run, Gulliver's Travels went into foreign release starting in February 1940.

In spite of the profits earned domestically and internationally, Paramount held Fleischer Studios to a $350,000 penalty for going over budget. This was the beginning of the financial difficulties Fleischer Studios encountered as it entered the 1940s.

When the Fleischer film library was sold to television in 1955, Gulliver's Travels was included and became a local television station holiday film shown during the Thanksgiving and Christmas holidays. It was also re-released theatrically in Technicolor prints for Saturday matinee children's programs well into the mid-1960s.

In October 2012, the Turner Classic Movies channel debuted the film, transferred from an original 35mm Technicolor release print owned by the Museum of Modern Art Department of Film, for the first time on television in a special hosted by Robert Osborne and Jerry Beck dedicated to rare animated films, including Mr. Bug Goes to Town, Lotte Reiniger's The Adventures of Prince Achmed, the UPA cartoons and the silent cartoons of 1907 to 1932 of the New York Studios.

Home media
Due to the film's public domain status, it has been released by many distributors in various home video formats.
E1 Entertainment released the film on Blu-ray Disc on March 10, 2009, but received strong criticism for presenting the movie in a stretched and cropped 1.75:1 format, as well as applying heavy noise reduction.
In March 2014, Thunderbean Animation released a superior restored version of the film with several Fleischer Studios shorts in a Blu-ray/DVD combo pack titled Fleischer Classics Featuring Gulliver's Travels.

Awards
The film was nominated for two Academy Awards:
 Victor Young for Best Music, Original Score
 Ralph Rainger (music) and Leo Robin (lyrics) for Best Music, Original Song ("Faithful Forever")

The film lost both awards to Metro-Goldwyn-Mayer's The Wizard of Oz.

Spin-off cartoons
The film was spun off into two short-lived Fleischer cartoon short series: the Gabby series and the Animated Antics cartoons starring the three spies, Sneak, Snoop and Snitch and Twinkletoes (the carrier pigeon).

See also
 List of animated feature films
 1939 in film

Further reading
 Barrier, Michael (1999). Hollywood Cartoons: American Animation in Its Golden Age. Oxford: Oxford University Press. .
 Maltin, Leonard (1980, updated 1987). Of Mice and Magic: A History of American Animated Cartoons. New York: Penguin Books. .
 Pointer, Ray (2016). "The Art and Inventions of Max Fleischer: American Animation Pioneer". McFarland & Co. Publishers.

References

External links

 
 
 
 
 
 Gulliver's Travels at Don Markstein's Toonopedia. Archived from the original on September 1, 2016.

1939 films
1930s American animated films
1930s children's animated films
1930s color films
1939 comedy-drama films
1930s fantasy adventure films
1939 musical comedy films
1930s musical drama films
American children's animated fantasy films
American comedy-drama films
American musical comedy films
American musical drama films
American fantasy adventure films
Animated films based on novels
Fiction set in 1699
Films directed by Dave Fleischer
Films scored by Victor Young
1939 animated films
Films based on Gulliver's Travels
Films set in the 1690s
Fleischer Studios films
Paramount Pictures films
Paramount Pictures animated films
Rotoscoped films
Articles containing video clips
1930s English-language films
Films about kings